Makasar is a district (kecamatan) of East Jakarta, Indonesia. It had an area of 21.85 km2 and population of 185,830 at the 2010 Census; the latest official estimate (for mid 2019) is 204,595.

The boundaries of Makasar District are Kali Malang channel to the north, Sunter River to the east, Jagorawi Toll Road to the west, and Taman Mini 2 – Pondok Gede Raya Road to the south. The Taman Mini Indonesia Indah area is located in Cipayung District (Setu Administrative Village), but the museum complex of Purna Bhakti Pertiwi, a museum also located in Taman Mini Indonesia Indah, is located in Makasar District (Pinang Ranti Administrative Village).

Kampung Makasar 
Kampung Makasar is an area that is located in Makasar Administrative Village and part of Kebon Pala Administrative Village (Kramat Jati District). The area is known as "Kampung Makasar" (Makasar Village) because it was used as a settlement for people from Makasar, under the leadership of Captain Daeng Matara in 1686. These people are former war prisoners that was brought to Batavia after the Gowa Sultanate, under the sultanate of Sultan Hasanuddin, was defeated by the Dutch Empire.

Kelurahan (administrative village) 
The district of Makasar is divided into five administrative villages (kelurahan):
Pinang Ranti – area code 13560
Makasar – area code 13570
Halim Perdanakusuma – area code 13610
Cipinang Melayu – area code 13620
Kebon Pala – area code 13650

List of important places 
Taman Mini Indonesia Indah (TMII) where includes Purna Bhakti Pertiwi Museum and At-Tin Mosque
Halim Perdanakusuma International Airport

References 

Districts of Jakarta
East Jakarta